Josh Bernstein hosts the Josh Bernstein Uncensored Show, which is an American conservative talk show (according to its own website) airing daily. He is also known for his prior show on YouTube, The Josh Bernstein Show.

Career
The Josh Bernstein Show began as an internet podcast in 2014. Since then, it had evolved into a live-recorded TV show with weekly guests. His original weekly program had been named in the Top Talk Radio's "Top 100 Conservative All Stars List". and he criticized a women's march, which he maintained was against Trump. According to the Right Wing Watch website in 2020, after saying Rep Ilhan Omar "should be executed”, YouTube removed Bernstein's video, and his Patreon account and Roku channel were closed. Bernstein started the Josh Bernstein Uncensored Show on a different platform.

Bernstein has contributed to The NutriMedical Report W/Dr. Bill, The Allan Nathan Show, and The Lars Larson Show.

As a commentator and analyst, Josh Bernstein has been featured by multiple publications including Forbes, The Dove (according to People for the American Way), The Atlantic (where 'the Atlantic' maintains Bernstein laments that it is harder for American Football players to hurt each other), One America News Network, Next News Network, PIJN News,(when he stated in his opinion war was likely following the 2016 Olympics) and the USA Today magazine (not related to the USA Today newspaper). In addition, Bernstein has also been a contributor to Breitbart News and Mediaequalizer.com.

In March 2021, Bernstein advocated removing Joe Biden from office until an actual audit of the election results had been done.

Bernstein encouraged his viewers to resist COVID vaccination, "at all costs", he also opposed mask mandates and other mandates during the COVID-19 pandemic.  In September 2021, Bernstein announced he was infected with COVID-19, and with the utilization of Ivermectin, recovered without permanent damage or hospitalization.

References

Living people
American democracy activists
American gun rights activists
People from New Jersey
American political commentators
American podcasters
American public access television personalities
American social commentators
American talk radio hosts
American YouTubers
Privacy activists
Year of birth missing (living people)